Unity Christian High School (commonly Unity Christian, UCHS, or UNITY) is a Christian private secondary school in Barrie, Ontario, Canada, serving students in grades 9–12.  Graduating students are eligible to receive an Ontario Secondary School Diploma from the Ministry of Education and Training, in addition to a Unity Christian High School diploma.

Unity is a member of the Ontario Alliance of Christian Schools.

Unity was founded in 2004 and was located in Inniswood Baptist Church. After one year, it relocated to a wing of Timothy Christian School, a private Christian grade school also located in Barrie. Unity started with only grades 9 and 10, and has added a year every two semesters until reaching its current 4 grades, 9-12. It had its first graduation at the conclusion of the 2007/8 school year. Unity purchased 25 Burton Ave., previously King Edward Public School, in April 2010. They began to hold classes in the building in September 2010.

References

External links 
 Official school website

Educational institutions established in 2004
High schools in Barrie
Christian schools in Canada
2004 establishments in Ontario